Petran is a village and a former municipality in the Gjirokastër County, southern Albania. At the 2015 local government reform it became a subdivision of the municipality Përmet. The population at the 2011 census was 1,622. The municipal unit consists of the villages Petran, Leshnicë, Leusë, Lipë, Qilarishtë, Badilonjë, Benjë-Novoselë, Delvinë, Kaludh, Lupckë, Gjinakar (Gjinkar), Ogdunan, Isgar, Lipivan-Trabozishtë, Tremisht and Bodar. There are a couple of restaurants that look out over the Vjosa river.

Demographics
The village of Lipë is inhabited by inhabitants whose mother tongue is Albanian.

Notable people
Stath Melani, Orthodox priest and participant in the Congress of Manastir, from Melan.

References

Sources 

Former municipalities in Gjirokastër County
Administrative units of Përmet
Villages in Gjirokastër County